Carlos Berlocq and Frederico Gil were the defending champions. Berlocq didn't start this year.
Gil partnered up with Rui Machado, but they lost to Bracciali/Starace in the semifinal.
Daniele Bracciali and Potito Starace defeated Santiago Giraldo and Pere Riba in the final 6–3, 6–4.

Seeds

Draw

Draw

References
 Doubles Draw

Sporting Challenger - Doubles
Sporting Challenger